The Nephilim (Nəfīlīm) are mysterious beings or people in the Hebrew Bible who are described as being large and strong.  The word Nephilim is loosely trans­lated as giants in most translations of the Hebrew Bible, but left untranslated in others. Some Jewish explanations interpret them as hybrid sons of fallen angels (demigods).

The main reference to them is in Genesis 6:1–4, but the passage is ambiguous and the identity of the Nephilim is disputed. According to  the Book of Numbers 13:33, a report from ten of the Twelve Spies was given of them inhabiting Canaan at the time of the Israelite conquest of Canaan.

A similar or identical biblical Hebrew term, read as "Nephilim" by some scholars, or as the word "fallen" by others, appears in the Book of Ezekiel 32:27 and is also mentioned in the deuterocanonical books Judith 16:6, Sirach 16:7, Baruch 3:26–28, and Wisdom 14:6.

Etymology
The Brown-Driver-Briggs Lexicon (1908) gives the meaning of Nephilim as "giants", and holds that proposed etymologies of the word are "all very precarious". Many suggested interpretations are based on the assumption that the word is a derivative of Hebrew verbal root  "fall." Robert Baker Girdlestone argued in 1871 the word comes from the hif'il causative stem, implying that the Nephilim are to be perceived as 'those that cause others to fall down'. Ronald Hendel states that it is a passive form: 'ones who have fallen', grammatically analogous to  'one who is appointed' (i.e., a deputy or overseer),  'one who is bound' (i.e., a prisoner), etc.

The majority of ancient biblical translations – including the Septuagint, Theodotion, Latin Vulgate, Samaritan Targum, Targum Onkelos, and Targum Neofiti – interpret the word to mean "giants". Symmachus translates it as "the violent ones" and Aquila's translation has been interpreted to mean either "the fallen ones" or "the ones falling [upon their enemies]."

In the Hebrew Bible
In the Hebrew Bible, there are three interconnected passages referencing the nephilim. Two of them come from the Pentateuch. The first occurrence is in Genesis 6:1–4, immediately before the account of Noah's Ark. Genesis 6:4 reads as follows:

Where the Jewish Publication Society translation simply transliterates the Hebrew nephilim as "Nephilim", the King James Version translates the term as "giants".

The nature of the Nephilim is complicated by the ambiguity of Genesis 6:4, which leaves it unclear whether they are the "sons of God" or their offspring who are the "mighty men of old, men of renown". Richard Hess takes it to mean that the Nephilim are the offspring, as does P. W. Coxon.

The second is Numbers 13:32–33 where ten of the Twelve Spies report that they have seen fearsome giants in Canaan:

Outside the Pentateuch there is one more passage indirectly referencing nephilim and this is Ezekiel 32:17–32. Of special significance is Ezekiel 32:27, which contains a phrase of disputed meaning. With the traditional vowels added to the text in the medieval period, the phrase is read gibborim nophlim ("'fallen warriors" or "fallen Gibborim"), although some scholars read the phrase as gibborim nephilim ("Nephilim warriors" or "warriors, Nephilim"). According to Ronald S. Hendel, the phrase should be interpreted as "warriors, the Nephilim" in a reference to Genesis 6:4. The verse as understood by Hendel reads:

Brian R. Doak, on the other hand, proposes to read the term as the Hebrew verb "fallen" (נופלים nophlim), not a use of the specific term "Nephilim", but still according to Doak a clear reference to the Nephilim tradition as found in Genesis.

Interpretations

Giants 

Most of the contemporary English translations of Genesis 6:1–4 and Numbers 13:33 render the Hebrew nefilim as "giants". This tendency in turn stems from the fact that one of the earliest translations of the Hebrew Bible, the Septuagint, composed in the 3rd or 2nd century BCE, renders the said word as gigantes. The choice made by the Greek translators has been later adopted into the Latin translation, the Vulgate, compiled in the 4th or 5th century CE, which uses the transcription of the Greek term rather than the literal translation of the Hebrew nefilim. From there, the tradition of the giant progeny of the sons of God and the daughters of men spread to later medieval translations of the Bible.

The decision of the Greek translators to render the Hebrew nefilim as Greek gigantes is a separate matter. The Hebrew nefilim means literally "the fallen ones" and the strict translation into Greek would be peptokotes, which in fact appears in the Septuagint of Ezekiel 32:22–27. It seems then that the authors of Septuagint wished not only to simply translate the foreign term into Greek, but also to employ a term which would be intelligible and meaningful for their Hellenistic audiences. Given the complex meaning of the nefilim which emerged from the three interconnected biblical passages (human–divine hybrids in Genesis 6, autochthonous people in Numbers 13 and ancient warriors trapped in the underworld in Ezekiel 32), the Greek translators recognized some similarities. First and foremost, both nefilim and gigantes were liminal beings resulting from the union of the opposite orders and as such retained the unclear status between the human and divine. Similarly dim was their moral designation and the sources witnessed to both awe and fascination with which these figures must have been looked upon. Secondly, both were presented as impersonating chaotic qualities and posing some serious danger to gods and humans. They appeared either in the prehistoric or early historical context, but in both cases they preceded the ordering of the cosmos. Lastly, both gigantes and nefilim were clearly connected with the underworld and were said to have originated from earth, and they both end up closed therein.

In 1 Enoch, they were "great giants, whose height was three hundred cubits".

The Quran refers to the people of Ād in Quran 26:130 whom the prophet Hud declares to be like jabbarin (Hebrew: gibborim), probably a reference to the Biblical Nephilim. However, according to Islamic legend, the ʿĀd were not wiped out by the flood, since some of them had been too tall to be drowned. Instead, God destroyed them after they rejected further warnings. After death, they were banished into the lower layers of hell.

Fallen angels

All early sources refer to the "sons of heaven" as angels. From the third century BCE onwards, references are found in the Enochic literature, the Dead Sea Scrolls (the Genesis Apocryphon, the Damascus Document, 4Q180), Jubilees, the Testament of Reuben, 2 Baruch, Josephus, and the book of Jude (compare with 2 Peter 2). For example: 1 Enoch 7:2 "And when the angels, (3) the sons of heaven, beheld them, they became enamoured of them, saying to each other, Come, let us select for ourselves wives from the progeny of men, and let us beget children." Some Christian apologists, such as Tertullian and especially Lactantius, shared this opinion.

The earliest statement in a secondary commentary explicitly interpreting this to mean that angelic beings mated with humans can be traced to the rabbinical Targum Pseudo-Jonathan and it has since become especially commonplace in modern Christian commentaries. This line of interpretation finds additional support in the text of Genesis 6:4, which juxtaposes the sons of God (male gender, divine nature) with the daughters of men (female gender, human nature). From this parallelism it could be inferred that the sons of God are understood as some superhuman beings.

The New American Bible commentary draws a parallel to the Epistle of Jude and the statements set forth in Genesis, suggesting that the Epistle refers implicitly to the paternity of Nephilim as heavenly beings who came to earth and had sexual intercourse with women. The footnotes of the Jerusalem Bible suggest that the biblical author intended the Nephilim to be an "anecdote of a superhuman race".

Some Christian commentators have argued against this view, citing Jesus's statement that angels do not marry. Others believe that Jesus was only referring to angels in heaven.

Evidence cited in favor of the fallen angels interpretation includes the fact that the phrase "the sons of God" (or "sons of the gods") is used twice outside of Genesis chapter 6, in the Book of Job (1:6 and 2:1) where the phrase explicitly references angels. The Septuagint manuscript Codex Alexandrinus reading of Genesis 6:2 renders this phrase as "the angels of God" while Codex Vaticanus reads "sons".

Targum Pseudo-Jonathan identifies the Nephilim as Shemihaza and the angels in the name list from 1 Enoch.

Second Temple Judaism

The story of the Nephilim is further elaborated in the Book of Enoch. Samyaza, an angel of high rank, is described as leading a rebel sect of angels in a descent to earth to have sexual intercourse with human females:

In this tradition, the children of the Nephilim are called the Elioud, who are considered a separate race from the Nephilim, but they share the fate of the Nephilim.

Some believe the fallen angels who begat the Nephilim were cast into Tartarus (2 Peter 2:4, Jude 1:6) (Greek Enoch 20:2), a place of "total darkness". An interpretation is that God granted ten percent of the disembodied spirits of the Nephilim to remain after the flood, as demons, to try to lead the human race astray until the final Judgment.

In addition to Enoch, the Book of Jubilees (7:21–25) also states that ridding the Earth of these Nephilim was one of God's purposes for flooding the Earth in Noah's time. These works describe the Nephilim as being evil giants.

There are also allusions to these descendants in the deuterocanonical books of Judith (16:6), Sirach (16:7), Baruch (3:26–28), and Wisdom of Solomon (14:6), and in the non-deuterocanonical 3 Maccabees (2:4).

The New Testament Epistle of Jude (14–15) cites from 1 Enoch 1:9, which many scholars believe is based on Deuteronomy 33:2. To most commentators this confirms that the author of Jude regarded the Enochic interpretations of Genesis 6 as correct; however, others have questioned this.

Descendants of Seth and Cain
References to the offspring of Seth rebelling from God and mingling with the daughters of Cain are found from the second century CE onwards in both Christian and Jewish sources (e.g. Rabbi Shimon bar Yochai, Augustine of Hippo, Sextus Julius Africanus, and the Letters attributed to St. Clement). It is also the view expressed in the modern canonical Amharic Ethiopian Orthodox Bible: Henok 2:1–3 "and the Offspring of Seth, who were upon the Holy Mount, saw them and loved them. And they told one another, 'Come, let us choose for us daughters from Cain's children; let us bear children for us.

Orthodox Judaism has taken a stance against the idea that Genesis 6 refers to angels or that angels could intermarry with men. Shimon bar Yochai pronounced a curse on anyone teaching this idea. Rashi and Nachmanides followed this. Pseudo-Philo (Biblical Antiquities 3:1–3) may also imply that the "sons of God" were human. Consequently, most Jewish commentaries and translations describe the Nephilim as being from the offspring of "sons of nobles", rather than from "sons of God" or "sons of angels". This is also the rendering suggested in the Targum Onqelos, Symmachus and the Samaritan Targum, which read "sons of the rulers", where Targum Neophyti reads "sons of the judges".

Likewise, a long-held view among some Christians is that the "sons of God" were the formerly righteous descendants of Seth who rebelled, while the "daughters of men" were the unrighteous descendants of Cain, and the Nephilim the offspring of their union. This view, dating to at least the 1st century CE in Jewish literature as described above, is also found in Christian sources from the 3rd century if not earlier, with references throughout the Clementine literature, as well as in Sextus Julius Africanus, Ephrem the Syrian, and others. Holders of this view have looked for support in Jesus' statement that "in those days before the flood they [humans] were ... marrying and giving in marriage" (emphasis added).

Some individuals and groups, including St. Augustine, John Chrysostom, and John Calvin, take the view of Genesis 6:2 that the "Angels" who fathered the Nephilim referred to certain human males from the lineage of Seth, who were called sons of God probably in reference to their prior covenant with Yahweh (cf.); according to these sources, these men had begun to pursue bodily interests, and so took wives of "the daughters of men", e.g., those who were descended from Cain or from any people who did not worship God.

This also is the view of the Ethiopian Orthodox Church, supported by their own Ge'ez manuscripts and Amharic translation of the Haile Selassie Bible—where the books of 1 Enoch and Jubilees, counted as canonical by this church, differ from western academic editions. The "Sons of Seth view" is also the view presented in a few extra-biblical, yet ancient works, including Clementine literature, the 3rd century Cave of Treasures, and the c. 6th century Ge'ez work The Conflict of Adam and Eve with Satan. In these sources, these offspring of Seth were said to have disobeyed God, by breeding with the Cainites and producing wicked children "who were all unlike", thus angering God into bringing about the Deluge, as in the Conflict:

Arguments from culture and mythology
In Aramaic culture, the term niyphelah refers to the Constellation of Orion and nephilim to the offspring of Orion in mythology. However the Brown–Driver–Briggs lexicon notes this as a "dubious etymology" and "all very precarious".

J. C. Greenfield mentions that "it has been proposed that the tale of the Nephilim, alluded to in Genesis 6 is based on some of the negative aspects of the Apkallu tradition." The apkallu in Sumerian mythology were seven legendary culture heroes from before the Flood, of human descent, but possessing extraordinary wisdom from the gods, and one of the seven apkallu, Adapa, was therefore called "son of Ea" the Babylonian god, despite his human origin.

Arabian paganism
Fallen angels were believed by Arab pagans to be sent to earth in form of men. Some of them mated with humans and gave rise to hybrid children. As recorded by Al-Jahiz, a common belief held that Abu Jurhum, the ancestor of the Jurhum tribe, was actually the son of a disobedient angel and a human woman.

Fossil remains

In 1786, Johann Friedrich Blumenbach found out that these remains belonged to a mammoth. Cotton Mather believed that fossilized leg bones and teeth discovered near Albany, New York, in 1705, were the remains of nephilim who perished in a great flood. Paleontologists have identified these as mastodon remains.

In popular culture

The name and idea of Nephilim, like many other religious concepts, is sometimes used in popular culture. Examples include the gothic rock band Fields of the Nephilim, The Renquist Quartet novels by Mick Farren, The Mortal Instruments, The Infernal Devices, The Last Hours, The Dark Artifices and other books in The Shadowhunter Chronicles series by Cassandra Clare, the Hush, Hush series by Becca Fitzpatrick, the book Many Waters by Madeleine L'Engle, and TV series The X-Files and Supernatural. In the video game series Darksiders, the four horsemen of the apocalypse are said to be nephilim, wherein the nephilim were created by the unholy union of angels and demons. Dante and Vergil, the main characters of the game DmC: Devil May Cry (2013), a reboot of the popular original series Devil May Cry, are also referred to as Nephilim; being the offspring of the demon Sparda and the angel Eva. In the trading card game Magic: The Gathering, the Nephilim are interpreted as Old Gods from before modern society. In Diablo 3, the Nephalem were the first humans upon Sanctuary, created as a result of the union between angels and demons. In the heist-themed first person shooter Payday 2, several paintings, artifacts, and far off visuals reference the Nephilim, and a secret ending to the game brings in alien technology supposedly left by the Nephilim. A creature referred to as "Nephilim" appears in Season 2 of the Japanese animated series Symphogear. Nephilim is a role-playing game about powerful elemental entities reincarnating into human beings.

See also 

 Anakim
 Asura
 Book of Giants
 Cain tradition
 Cambion
 Demigod
 Emim
 List of angels in theology
 List of giants in mythology and folklore
 Neanderthal
 Nephele
 
 Quinametzin
 Rephaim
 Serpent seed
 Titan (mythology)

References

External links
 Jewish Encyclopedia: Fall of Angels
 Catholic Encyclopedia: Angels

 
Angels in Christianity
Angels in Judaism
Arabian legendary creatures
Bereshit (parashah)
Book of Genesis people
Classes of angels
Demons in Christianity
Demons in Judaism
Fallen angels
Giants in the Hebrew Bible
Mythological human hybrids
Book of Jubilees